Waun Fawr, Puncheston is a Site of Special Scientific Interest (or SSSI) in Pembrokeshire, South Wales. It has been designated as a Site of Special Scientific Interest since March 1995 in an attempt to protect its fragile biological elements.

Type
This site is designated due to its biological qualities. SSSIs in Wales have been notified for a total of 142 different animal species and 191 different plant species.

The site is of special interest for its population of the internationally rare southern damselfly (Coenagrion mercuriale), which breeds in this small valley near Afon Anghof, above Puncheston. A number of springs and streams support a large population of the damselfly. Amongst the abundant wetland plants is a population of the pale butterwort (Pinguicula lusitanica).

See also
List of Sites of Special Scientific Interest in Pembrokeshire

References

External links
Natural Resources Wales website

Sites of Special Scientific Interest in Pembrokeshire